Sludica is an extinct genus of procynosuchid cynodont from the Late Permian of Russia. Fossils have been found in the Ilinskoe Assemblage Zone within Velikoustyugsky District in Vologda Oblast, correlated with the Cistecephalus Assemblage Zone. The type and only species is Sludica bulanovi.

References 

Prehistoric cynodont genera
Lopingian synapsids of Europe
Permian Russia
Fossils of Russia
Fossil taxa described in 2012